The 1998 Chicago Cubs season was the 127th season of the Chicago Cubs franchise, the 123rd in the National League and the 83rd at Wrigley Field. The Cubs finished second in the National League Central with a record of 90–73.

The season was a significant one for the team for several reasons. Firstly, it saw the Cubs reach the playoffs for the first time since 1989 by way of a Wild Card berth, which they clinched after winning a one-game playoff against the San Francisco Giants. The Cubs, however, would lose the Division Series in a 3-0 sweep by the Atlanta Braves. The season also saw Sammy Sosa, along with Mark McGwire, surpass the existing single-season home run record of 61. Sosa would hold the home run lead at several points over the course of the season, eventually finishing four homers behind McGwire (66 and 70 respectively). The 1998 season also saw the debut of Kerry Wood, who drew immediate national attention because of a 20-strikeout performance in his fifth career start, a 13-6 record over 26 starts, and more than 12 strikeouts per nine innings pitched.

Offseason

Harry Caray 
On February 18, 1998, Cubs broadcaster Harry Caray died. Caray had the benefit of being in the booth during the NL East title run in 1984, when being a Cub fan became more popular to Chicagoans.  His trademark call of "Holy Cow!" and his singing of "Take me out to the ballgame" during the 7th inning stretch made Caray a fan favorite both locally and, thanks to WGN's superstation status, on a national level as well.

The Cubs still have a live singer, usually a celebrity, during the 7th inning stretch to honor Caray's memory to this day.  Caray is also honored with a statue located at the corner of Sheffield and Addison streets, and during the 1998 season, a patch with Caray's caricature and Brickhouse's trademark "Hey Hey" were worn on the players sleeves to honor the passing of both commentators within a span of a few months.  Harry's popularity also led to his grandson Chip Caray joining the broadcast team in winter of 1997, shortly before Harry's death.

Notable transactions 
 November 18, 1997: Brooks Kieschnick was drafted by the Tampa Bay Devil Rays from the Chicago Cubs as the 64th pick in the 1997 expansion draft.

Regular season
 May 6, 1998 – Cubs pitcher Kerry Wood struck out 20 Houston Astros tying the major league record and setting a new National League record. Wood accomplished this feat in only his fifth major league start.
 September 8, 1998 – Cubs pitcher Steve Trachsel gave up Mark McGwire's 62nd home run of the season. The home run would break the record set by Roger Maris for most home runs in a season.
 September 13, 1998 – Sammy Sosa hits home runs number 61 and 62 tying McGwire in the home run race in the Cubs 11-10 win over Milwaukee.
 September 23, 1998 – In a tie with the New York Mets for the lead in the NL Wild Card standings with three games remaining, the Cubs held a 7-5 lead in the bottom of the 9th inning in a crucial game against the Milwaukee Brewers, but the Brewers had the bases loaded with two out. Closer Rod Beck delivered to Geoff Jenkins, and he hit an easy fly ball to left fielder Brant Brown. But Brown dropped the ball and it skipped past him. This error allowed three runs to score, including the winning run, and the Brewers pulled off an 8-7 victory.

In the final game of the season, with the Cubs and Giants tied for the Wild Card lead, a Terry Mulholland throwing error cost the Cubs a victory against the Houston Astros, as San Francisco held an early lead in Colorado, and the team's playoff hopes were in jeopardy.  However, a Neifi Pérez walk-off home run gave the Rockies a win and forced a one-game playoff at Wrigley Field.

Notable transactions 
 July 6, 1998: Glenallen Hill was selected off waivers by the Chicago Cubs from the Seattle Mariners.
 August 3, 1998: Gary Gaetti was claimed off waivers by the Chicago Cubs from the St. Louis Cardinals.

Season standings

Record vs. opponents

Roster

Sammy Sosa's 66 home runs

Player stats

Batting

Starters by position 
Note: Pos = Position; G = Games played; AB = At bats; H = Hits; Avg. = Batting average; HR = Home runs; RBI = Runs batted in

Other batters 
Note: G = Games played; AB = At bats; H = Hits; Avg. = Batting average; HR = Home runs; RBI = Runs batted in

Pitching

Starting pitchers 
Note: G = Games pitched; IP = Innings pitched; W = Wins; L = Losses; ERA = Earned run average; SO = Strikeouts

Other pitchers 
Note: G = Games pitched; IP = Innings pitched; W = Wins; L = Losses; ERA = Earned run average; SO = Strikeouts

Relief pitchers 
Note: G = Games pitched; W = Wins; L = Losses; SV = Saves; ERA = Earned run average; SO = Strikeouts

Postseason

Wild Card tie-breaker game 

One-game playoff to break tie in regular season standings

Chicago Cubs 5, San Francisco Giants 3 (Wrigley Field)

Division Series 

NL Division Series (Best of 5)

Atlanta Braves 7, Chicago Cubs 1 (Turner Field)
Atlanta Braves 2, Chicago Cubs 1 (Turner Field)
Atlanta Braves 6, Chicago Cubs 2 (Wrigley Field)

Braves win series 3-0

Awards and honors
 Sammy Sosa, National League Most Valuable Player
 Sammy Sosa, Outfield, Roberto Clemente Award
 Sammy Sosa, Franchise Record, Most Home Runs in One Season
 Sammy Sosa, National League Record, Fewest Triples in One Season with 600 or more At-Bats (0)
 Kerry Wood, National League Rookie of the Year

All-Star Game

Farm system

References

External links
1998 Chicago Cubs at Baseball Reference
1998 Chicago Cubs on Baseball Almanac

Chicago Cubs seasons
Chicago Cubs season
Chicago Cubs